Jaime Brooks (born May 5, 1984) is a Canadian-American songwriter and musician.

Career

2009–2013: Elite Gymnastics 

Elite Gymnastics, self-described as a "multimedia art project", was an electronic music duo from Minneapolis, Minnesota and later a solo project from Vancouver, British Columbia. Formed by Brooks in Minneapolis around 2009, original lineups consisted of various local musicians in the Minneapolis metro area and eventually settled as a duo of James Brooks and Josh Clancy. They self-released several EPs and mixtapes before Clancy's departure in 2012.

As a duo they released seven EPs, which credited Brooks with most of the songwriting and musical production, and Clancy with most of the album artwork: Real Friends, Neu! '92, Gizzard Greens V.1, Gizzard Greens V.2, Ruin (and its B-side, Ruin 2), Ruin 3, and Ruin 4. Gizzard Greens is a digital double EP (though the two volumes were released individually in 2010 and 2011) in the style of remix albums, featuring a cover of Cheryl Cole's "Parachute" and a mashup combining Sub Focus' remix of Rusko's "Hold On" (featuring Amber Coffman) with Blame's "Piano Takes You" on the first volume, and bootleg remixes of Lady Gaga's "Poker Face" and Waka Flocka Flame's "Fuck the Club Up" (featuring Pastor Troy and Slim Dunkin) on the second.

The Ruin EP was reviewed favorably by Pitchfork magazine, earning a 7.8 album review rating and critical acclaim among a number of smaller publications, and quickly attracted an online cult following. Ruin saw a physical release in vinyl format under the electronic label Acéphale, with the B-side (Ruin 2) being five remixed versions of its A-side tracks. Previous albums were self-released online in digital format for free through their Tumblr-based imprint Psychedelic Surf Club. Ruin and Ruin 2 were later self-released for free download as a digital double EP. Ruin 4 includes "Life/Trap" and "We Got Lost", two previously unreleased tracks which didn't make it onto the Ruin EP, and a rerecorded version of Ruin'''s "Little Things" as a hidden track.

The name Elite Gymnastics was taken from the lyrics of "Ruthless Babysitting" by power electronics group Whitehouse.

 Josh Clancy's departure 
Following a 2012 tour as a supporting act for Sleigh Bells, Elite Gymnastics became Brooks' solo project with Clancy parting ways after a reportedly tumultuous experience on the road. "Our personal relationship is kinda kaput for the time being," Brooks describes in a Tumblr post detailing some of the reasons for continuing the project solo. Brooks continued the project solo, relocating to Vancouver following a stint in New York City, releasing the single "Andreja 4-Ever" as part of the Adult Swim Singles Program the same year.

The solo form of Elite Gymnastics only saw the release of single "Andreja 4-Ever" and a couple of remixes (for Sky Ferreira and How to Dress Well) before Brooks decided to rename the project; first to Dead Girlfriends, then to Default Genders.

 2013–2014: Default Genders 

 Dead Girlfriends and "On Fraternity" controversy 
The release of single "On Fraternity" from the debut EP Stop Pretending, in association with the name change to Dead Girlfriends, caused a substantial amount of controversy and prompted a series of articles by various publications and an online round table discussion by Spin magazine. Brooks rechristened the project Default Genders shortly thereafter.

 2015–2018: Eponymity 
During a four-year period following relocation to Los Angeles, California, Brooks released a series of demos and bootleg remixes on SoundCloud eponymously, though they were not made available for purchase or download.

 2019-2020: Default Genders 
 Main Pop Girl 2019 
On February 4, 2019, Brooks released a second full-length Default Genders album titled Main Pop Girl 2019, which includes a track featuring pop artist No Rome, updated versions of demos previously released eponymously, and an updated version of "Sophie" from Magical Pessimism 2014 featuring artist Beth Sawlts. The album was reviewed favorably by Pitchfork magazine, receiving an 8.0 rating.

 Pain Mop Girl 2020 
On April 20, 2020, Brooks released a new full-length Default Genders album titled Pain Mop Girl 2020, which consists mostly of guest-remixed and reworked versions of Main Pop Girl 2019 songs, and features two original songs as the opening tracks.

 Main Pop Girls 2015–2018 
On December 4, 2020, Brooks released a collection of demos as an album titled Main Pop Girls 2015–2018 which consists of an unreleased song as the opening track and songs previously showcased eponymously as SoundCloud demos during 2015–2018, many of which laid the groundwork for material on subsequent Default Genders albums.

 2022: Elite Gymnastics revival 
In 2021, Brooks announced a reconciliation with Clancy and revealed intentions to revive the Elite Gymnastics name with his blessing (though ultimately not his involvement). A debut album,snow flakes 2022, was released on October 18, 2022 (the only prior commercial release under the name, RUIN, being considered a double EP). The album consists of re-workings of previously-recorded songs as well as new material, with the new lineup of Jaime Brooks and Viri Char.

 Discography 
 Elite Gymnastics 
 Extended plays 
 Real Friends (2010)
 Gizzard Greens V.1 (2010)
 Gizzard Greens V.2 (2011)
 Neu! '92 (2011)
 Ruin (2011)
 Ruin 2 (2011)
 Ruin 3 (2012)
 Ruin 4 (2012)

 Singles 
 "We Fly High (Original Version)" (2009)
 "Life/Trap" (2012)
 "Andreja 4-Ever" (2012)

 Unreleased songs 
 "Real Love (The Hedgehog's Dilemma)" (2010)
 "I Just Wasn't Paying Attention" (2011)
 "Walls" (2011)

Note: "I Just Wasn't Paying Attention" is an early version of "We Got Lost" from Ruin 4.

 Remixes 
 Florrie – "Come Back to Mine (Elite Gymnastics Remix)" (2010)
 How to Dress Well – "Suicide Dream 2 (Elite Gymnastics Baptism)" (2011)
 Mozart Parties – "Where Has Everybody Gone? (Elite Gymnastics Remix)" (2011)
 Korallreven feat. Julianna Barwick – "Sa Sa Samoa (Elite Gymnastics Remix)" (2012)
 Sky Ferreira – "Red Lips (Elite Gymnastics Remix)" (2013)
 How to Dress Well – "& It Was U (Elite Gymnastics Remix)" (2013)

 Mixtapes 
 Mix for VnFold Magazine (2010)
 Mix for Opening Ceremony (2011)
 All We Fucking Care About is Kpop Whitehouse and Our Cats (Mix for Forty Ounce Clothing, 2011)
 I Want a 38-Minute Truce in Which There is No Rape (Mix for DIS Magazine, 2011)

 Default Genders 
 Studio albums 
 Magical Pessimism 2014 (2014)
 Main Pop Girl 2019 (2019)
 Pain Mop Girl 2020 (2020)
 Extended plays 
 Stop Pretending (2013)

 Singles 
 "On Fraternity" (2013)

 Mixtapes 
 Magical Pessimix #1 (2014)

 Jaime Brooks 
 Studio albums 
 Main Pop Girls 2015–2018 (The Demos)'' (2020)

References 

Canadian electronic musicians
Electronic musicians
Living people
Year of birth missing (living people)